The 2008 United States presidential election in West Virginia took place on November 4, 2008, and was part of the 2008 United States presidential election. Voters chose 5 representatives, or electors to the Electoral College, who voted for president and vice president.

West Virginia was won by Republican nominee John McCain by a 13.1% margin of victory. Prior to the election, all 17 news organizations considered this a state McCain would win, or otherwise considered as a safe red state. Despite its past voting record of heavily favoring Democratic presidential nominees, the state has lately been trending more Republican in presidential elections. Obama was the first Democratic presidential nominee since Woodrow Wilson in 1916 to win the nationwide presidential election without carrying West Virginia, and in that election Wilson had managed to win a single electoral vote, making Obama the first Democrat to win without carrying any electoral votes from the state.  Obama also became the first Democrat since 1928 to lose Logan County, a strongly unionized coal-dependent county that was the only county in West Virginia to vote for George McGovern in his landslide 1972 loss.

Despite Barack Obama's loss in the state, he is the most recent Democrat as of 2020 to win any of its counties in a presidential election, namely Boone County, Braxton County, Jefferson County, Marion County, McDowell County, Monongalia County, and Webster County. This also marked the first presidential election since 1924 in which West Virginia voted for the Republican presidential candidate while neighboring Virginia voted for the Democratic presidential candidate. This is the most recent presidential election in which the Democratic candidate received more than 40% of the vote in West Virginia. West Virginia was one of five states where Obama underperformed Kerry, the others being Arkansas, Louisiana, Oklahoma, and Tennessee.

Primaries
2008 West Virginia Democratic primary
2008 West Virginia Republican caucuses and primary

Campaign

Predictions
There were 16 news organizations who made state-by-state predictions of the election. Here are their last predictions before election day:

Polling

McCain lead in 16 of 17 pre-election polls. The final three polls showed McCain leading by an average of 53% to 41%.

Fundraising
John McCain raised a total of $291,184 in the state. Barack Obama raised $713,231.

Advertising and visits
Obama and his interest groups spent $1,437,178. McCain and his interest groups spent $1,920,720. Each ticket visited the state once.

Analysis
More than any other state, West Virginia highlighted Obama's trouble in Appalachian America. It swung heavily to the Democrats during the days of Franklin D. Roosevelt and remained reliably Democratic for most of the next 68 years. During that time, it only voted Republican three times, all in national Republican landslides--1956, 1972 and 1984. It also voted for Democrats (such as Jimmy Carter and Michael Dukakis) who went on to big national defeats. This was largely due to its blue-collar, heavily unionized workers, especially coal miners, who favored Democratic economic policy.

Starting in the campaign of Al Gore, however, the state's voters became more concerned with the national Democratic Party's perceived hostility toward the coal industry, which is a core part of the West Virginia economy. As a result, the state has been trending Republican in national elections. In 2008, neither presidential nominee campaigned heavily in the state.

On Election Day, McCain won West Virginia by 13.09 points while losing nationwide. McCain did well throughout the state, losing only a handful of counties. While his margins were best in the more conservative northern part of the state, he also improved significantly in Southern West Virginia. This coal-mining, union-heavy region was one of the most heavily Democratic places in the nation; Logan County, for example, cast 72% of its ballot for Bill Clinton. In 2008, however, John McCain won the county by double digits, becoming the first Republican to win it since Herbert Hoover in 1928.

On the other hand, Barack Obama did make gains in the area between Maryland and Virginia, counties which are a part of the Washington Metropolitan Area. Obama also ran close in Central West Virginia (the counties around the capital Charleston).

Despite the recent Republican success nationally, Democrats still dominated at the state and local level. After the 2008 election, Democrats held the governorship and every statewide office, two out of the state's three congressional districts in the U.S. House of Representatives, both U.S. Senate seats and supermajorities in both chambers of the state legislature. However, the Democratic Party's dominance of West Virginia has significantly waned in recent years; in the 2014 elections, the West Virginia Republican Party made major gains, capturing one of its two Senate seats, all of its congressional House seats for the first time since 1921, and gained control of both the West Virginia House of Delegates and the West Virginia Senate for the first time in 80 years.

During the same election, popular incumbent Democratic Governor Joe Manchin III was soundly reelected to a second term with 69.79% of the vote over Republican Russ Weeks, who took in 25.75%, while Jesse Johnson of the Mountain Party received 4.46%. Incumbent Democratic U.S. Senator Jay Rockefeller IV was also soundly reelected with 63.71% of the vote over Republican Jay Wolfe, who took in 36.27%. At the state level, Democrats picked up three seats in the West Virginia Senate, while Republicans picked up one seat in the West Virginia House of Delegates.

Results

  

|- class="vcard"
| style="background-color: ; width: 5px;" |
| class="org" | 
| class="fn" colspan="2" | Various candidates
| style="text-align: right; margin-right: 0.5em" | 1,761
| style="text-align: right; margin-right: 0.5em" | 0.25%
| style="text-align: right; margin-right: 0.5em" | 0
| style="text-align: right; margin-right: 0.5em" | 0.00%
| style="text-align: right; margin-right: 0.5em" | 0.24%
|-

By county

Counties that flipped from Democratic to Republican
 Brooke (largest borough: Wellsburg)
 Fayette (largest city: Fayetteville)
 Logan (largest borough: Logan)
 Mingo (largest borough: Williamson)

Counties that flipped from Republican to Democratic
 Jefferson (largest borough: Charles Town)
 Monogalia (largest borough: Morgantown)

By congressional District
John McCain swept all three of the state’s three congressional districts, including the two districts held by Democrats.

Electors 

Technically the voters of West Virginia cast their ballots for electors: representatives to the Electoral College. West Virginia is allocated 5 electors because it has 3 congressional districts and 2 senators. All candidates who appear on the ballot or qualify to receive write-in votes must submit a list of 5 electors, who pledge to vote for their candidate and their running mate. Whoever wins the majority of votes in the state is awarded all 5 electoral votes. Their chosen electors then vote for president and vice president. Although electors are pledged to their candidate and running mate, they are not obligated to vote for them. An elector who votes for someone other than their candidate is known as a faithless elector.

The electors of each state and the District of Columbia met on December 15, 2008, to cast their votes for president and vice president. The Electoral College itself never meets as one body. Instead the electors from each state and the District of Columbia met in their respective capitols.

All 5 were pledged to John McCain and Sarah Palin:
Robert Fish
Zane Lawhorn
Catherine Sue McKinney
Marti Riggall
Theresa Waxman

References

West Virginia
2008 West Virginia elections
2008